Basement Records is an American independent record label founded by Chuck Dietrich  in 2000. The company is headquartered in La Habra, California and doubles as a recording studio. The label's primary focus is American punk rock artists.

Basement Records artists have been featured on the soundtrack for the movie Piranha 3DD.

As owner of Basement Records Chuck Dietrich writes music for the hardcore punk band Bullet Treatment as well as many other outlets including music for the Xbox video game Sunset Overdrive.

Discography

References

OC Weekly Interview with Chuck Dietrich
List of Basement Records' artists
PunkNews.org Basement Records reference page

American independent record labels